Banzhang Mountain is a mountain that rises up 300 meters above sea level.  The geographical feature separates Ningxi of New Xiangzhou from Gongbei, both inside the city of Zhuhai, China.

References

Mountains of China

Zhuhai